Internationality is the concept of something "involving more than a single country", and may suggest interaction between or encompassing more than one nation, or generally beyond national boundaries. For example, international law, which is applied by more than one country and usually everywhere on Earth, and international language which is a language spoken by residents of more than one country. "International" is therefore also sometimes used as a synonym for "global".

As the United Nations noted in its Yearbook of the United Nations Commission on International Trade Law:

Historical origin of the word

The term international is of relatively recent vintage compared to much of the English language. It was coined by the utilitarian philosopher Jeremy Bentham in his An Introduction to the Principles of Morals and Legislation, which was printed for publication in 1780 and published in 1789, with Bentham writing: "The word international, it must be acknowledged, is a new one; though, it is hoped, sufficiently analogous and intelligible. It is calculated to express, in a more significant way, the branch of law which goes commonly under the name of the law of nations. The word was adopted in French in 1801. Thomas Erskine Holland noted in his article on Bentham in the 11th edition of the Encyclopædia Britannica that "Many of Bentham's phrases, such as 'international,' 'utilitarian,' 'codification,' are valuable additions to our language; but the majority of them, especially those of Greek derivation, have taken no root in it." In 1825, James Douglas of Cavero used the noun form when he wrote that "[a]n Influence, highly favourable to the Grecian States, consisted in their Internationality".

Internationality in politics and law 
In politics, "The International" may refer to a political international, specifically meaning a transnational organization of political parties having similar ideology or political orientation (e.g. communism, socialism, and Islamism). The international works together on points of agreement to co-ordinate activity. An international organization (also known as an "international institution" or an "intergovernmental organization") is a stable set of norms and rules meant to govern the behavior of states and other actors in the international system. Organizations may be established by a treaty or be an instrument governed by international law and possessing its own legal personality, such as the United Nations, the World Health Organization and NATO.

International law, also known as the law of nations and international ethics, is the set of rules, norms, and standards generally recognized as binding between nations. It establishes normative guidelines and a common conceptual framework for states across a broad range of domains, including war, diplomacy, trade, and human rights. International law aims to promote the practice of stable, consistent, and organized international relations. Public international law and international criminal law are particularly important areas.

The sources of international law include international custom (general state practice accepted as law), treaties, and general principles of law recognized by most national legal systems. International law may also be reflected in international comity, the practices and customs adopted by states to maintain good relations and mutual recognition, such as saluting the flag of a foreign ship or enforcing a foreign legal judgment. International law differs from state-based legal systems in that it is primarily—though not exclusively—applicable to countries, rather than to individuals, and operates largely through consent, since there is no universally accepted authority to enforce it upon sovereign states. Consequently, states may choose to not abide by international law, and even to break a treaty.

Internationality in other fields 
In linguistics, an international language, or world language, is one spoken by the people of more than one nation. English, Spanish, French and Arabic are considered to be world languages. In interlinguistics, international often has to do with languages rather than nations themselves. An "international word" is one that occurs in more than one language. These words are collected from widely spoken source or control languages, and often used to establish language systems that people can use to communicate internationally, and sometimes for other purposes such as to learn other languages more quickly. The vocabulary of Interlingua has a particularly wide range, because the control languages of Interlingua were selected to give its words and affixes their maximum geographic scope. In part, the language Ido is also a product of interlinguistic research.

In arts, an international art movement is an art movement with artists from more than one country, usually by many. Some international art movements are Letterist International, Situationist International, Stuckism International.

In team sports, an "international" match is a match between two national teams, or two players capped by a national team.

See also 
 Globalization
 International community
 International relations
 International (disambiguation)
 Internationalism (disambiguation)
 Multilateralism
 Multinational corporation
 Multinational state
 Supranational union
 United Nations
 World community

References

External links

Meaning of international on The Free Dictionary
Meaning of international  on Cambridge dictionary
Meaning of international on Oxford dictionary.

Sources 

International law
International sports
International relations